Kosmonavt Vladimir Komarov was a satellite tracking ship of the Soviet Union.

It was named after Vladimir Mikhaylovich Komarov, the cosmonaut who died on Soyuz 1.

It was built as an ordinary cargo ship in 1966 and converted in Leningrad in 1967.

It was decommissioned in 1989.

See also 
 , another Soviet satellite tracking ship
 , another Soviet satellite tracking ship

External links 
information on the ship

Ships of the Soviet space program
Ships built in the Soviet Union
Maritime vessels related to spaceflight
1966 ships